Events from the year 1669 in Ireland.

Incumbent
Monarch: Charles II

Events
January 11 – Peter Talbot is appointed Roman Catholic Archbishop of Dublin and Primate of Ireland (consecrated at Antwerp 29 April (9 May New Style)).
March 8 – James Lynch is appointed Roman Catholic Archbishop of Tuam (consecrated at Ghent 6 May (16 May NS)).
March 26 – a royal charter is granted to the trust established by Erasmus Smith for the provision of grammar schools in Ireland, under which
Drogheda Grammar School is founded.
The King's Hospital is endowed as The Hospital and Free School of King Charles II in Dublin.
May–August – George Fox, founder of the Quakers, visits Ireland. William Penn also returns to Ireland this year.
July 9 – Oliver Plunkett is appointed Roman Catholic Archbishop of Armagh and Primate of All Ireland (consecrated at Ghent 21 November (1 December NS)).
One of a pair of gold sun-discs from ca. 2500–2150 BCE is found at Ballyshannon.

Births
July 12 – Henry Boyle, 1st Baron Carleton, Chancellor of the Exchequer of England and Lord Treasurer of Ireland (d. 1725)
Sir Tristram Beresford, 3rd Baronet, politician (d. 1701)
William Cairnes, merchant and politician (d. 1707)
Christopher Fleming, 17th Baron Slane, soldier and politician (d. 1726)
Thomas Nugent, 4th Earl of Westmeath, soldier and noble (d. 1752)
William Southwell, soldier and politician (d. 1720)

Deaths
Arthur Jones, 2nd Viscount Ranelagh, politician.
Sir John Russell, 3rd Baronet, soldier (b. 1632?)

References

 
1660s in Ireland
Ireland
Years of the 17th century in Ireland